Jenaro is a given name. Notable people with the name include:

Jenaro de Urrutia Olaran (1893–1965), Spanish painter
Jenaro Flores Santos (born 1941), Bolivian trade union leader and politician
Jenaro Gajardo Vera (1919–1998), eccentric Chilean lawyer, painter and poet
Jenaro Pérez Villaamil (1807–1854), Spanish painter
Jenaro Pindú (1946–1993), prominent cartoonist, sculptor and architect of Paraguay
Jenaro Quesada, 1st Marquis of Miravalles (1818–1889), Grandee of Spain
Jenaro Sánchez Delgadillo (1886–1927), Mexican martyr who died in the Cristero War
Josephine Apieu Jenaro Aken (1955–2008), member of the Luo group from the Bahr el Ghazal area

See also
Jenaro Herrera District, one of eleven districts of the province Requena in Peru